The 2015 Pro Mazda Championship was the 17th season in series history. The series consisted of sixteen races at nine tracks, having expanded from fourteen races in 2014; adding races at NOLA Motorsports Park, the Streets of Toronto, Iowa Speedway and Mazda Raceway Laguna Seca, while dropping races at Houston, Milwaukee and Sonoma Raceway. The season began on March 28 at the Grand Prix of St. Petersburg and ended on September 13 at Laguna Seca.

Uruguay's Santiago Urrutia became the first champion from South America since Raphael Matos in 2005, driving for Team Pelfrey. Urrutia, who joined the series for the 2015 season after a year in GP3, won only three races during the season – at NOLA Motorsports Park, the Indianapolis Motor Speedway and Mid-Ohio – but consistent finishing (finishing 14 of 16 races in the top-5) saw him finish 53 points clear of his nearest rival in the championship standings. Second place in the standings went to Cape Motorsports driver Neil Alberico, holding off a late-season challenge from Juncos Racing's Garett Grist for the position, by a tally of eight points. Alberico won four races during the season – which was the most by any driver, shared with Andretti Autosport's Weiron Tan – while Grist won three of the final six races including a weekend sweep at Laguna Seca.

Tan himself finished fourth in the championship, as five finishes outside the top ten as well as a five-point penalty early in the season hampered his championship bid. The championship top five was completed by France's Timothé Buret of Juncos Racing, one point behind Tan, who was a race-winner at Indianapolis. The only other race winner was Florian Latorre, a compatriot of Buret, who won on the Streets of Toronto for Cape Motorsports. He finished eighth in the drivers' championship, due to the result being one of only three podium finishes during the season. In the teams' championship, Juncos Racing won the title mainly due to the results for Grist and Buret, with other team drivers José Gutiérrez and Will Owen. Juncos finished 39 points clear of Team Pelfrey. The expert drivers' championship for older drivers was won by World Speed Motorsports driver Bobby Eberle, taking 11 class wins during 2015.

Drivers and teams

Race calendar and results

Championship standings

Drivers' championship

 Ties in points broken by number of wins, or best finishes.
 The first race at the Indianapolis road course was a makeup for the canceled race at NOLA. Drivers who were not at NOLA were ineligible to score points in that race.

Teams' championship

Notes

References

External links
 

Pro Mazda Championship
Indy Pro 2000 Championship